Lawrence Valdemar Lewin (born 28 November 1975) is an English television actor. He appears on the CBBC show Horrible Histories, and featured in the Doctor Who Christmas special "The End of Time".

Career 
Lawry played a role in the Doctor Who Christmas special "The End of Time". Lewin is a friend of actor and writer John Finnemore; since 2011, he has acted as part of the regular ensemble in John Finnemore's Souvenir Programme, a sketch show for BBC Radio 4. He played "Beans" in the 2014 comedy miniseries Mr. Sloane.

Filmography

Television

References

External links 

Living people
English male television actors
1975 births